was a Japanese sprinter. He competed in the men's 400 metres at the 1936 Summer Olympics.

References

External links
 

1917 births
1994 deaths
Place of birth missing
Japanese male sprinters
Olympic male sprinters
Olympic athletes of Japan
Athletes (track and field) at the 1936 Summer Olympics
Japan Championships in Athletics winners
20th-century Japanese people